The Ambassador of the United Kingdom to Serbia is the United Kingdom's foremost diplomatic representative to the Republic of Serbia, and head of the UK's diplomatic mission in Belgrade.

List of heads of mission

Consul to Serbia
1837–1839: George Lloyd Hodges
1839–1842: No representative

Consul-General to Serbia
1842–1859: Thomas de Grenier de Fonblanque
1860: Robert Bulwer-Lytton
1860–1869: John Augustus Longworth

Agent and Consul-General to Serbia
1869–1875: John Augustus Longworth
1875–1879: William Arthur White

Minister Resident to Principality of Serbia
1879–1881: Gerard Francis Gould
1881–1885: Sidney Locock (from 1882 to the Kingdom of Serbia)

Minister Resident to the Kingdom of Serbia
1885–1886: Hugh Wyndham

Envoy Extraordinary and Minister Plenipotentiary to the Kingdom of Serbia
1886–1888: George Hugh Wyndham
1888–1890 Frederick Robert St John

Consul-General to the Kingdom of Serbia
1890–1892: Frederick Robert St John

Envoy Extraordinary and Minister Plenipotentiary to the Kingdom of Serbia
1893–1898: Edmund Fane
1892–1894: Ronald Douglas Grant Macdonald (as Vice-Consul) 
1894–1901: Ronald Douglas Grant Macdonald (as Consul) 
1898–1900: Edward Goschen
1900–1903: Sir George Bonham, 2nd Baronet
1903–1906: Wilfred Gilbert Thesiger (deputy)
1906–1910: Sir James Whitehead
1910–1913: Sir Ralph Paget
1914–1919: Charles Louis des Graz

Envoy Extraordinary and Minister Plenipotentiary to the Kingdom of the Serbs, Croats and Slovenes
1919–1925: Sir Alban Young
1925–1929: SIr Howard Kennard

Envoy Extraordinary and Minister Plenipotentiary to the Kingdom of Yugoslavia
1929–1935: Sir Nevile Henderson
1935–1939: Sir Ronald H. Campbell
1939–1941: Sir Ronald I. Campbell
1941–1943: Sir George Rendel
1943–1946: Sir Ralph Stevenson

Ambassador Extraordinary and Plenipotentiary to Yugoslavia
1946–1951: Charles Peake
1951–1954: Sir Ivo Mallet
1954–1957: Sir Frank Roberts
1957–1960: Sir John Walter Nicholls
1960–1964: Sir Michael Creswell
1964–1968: Sir Duncan Wilson
1968–1971: Sir Terence Garvey
1971–1977: Sir Dugald Stewart
1977–1980: Robert Farquharson
1980–1982: Edwin Bolland
1982–1985: Kenneth Scott
1985–1989: Andrew Wood
1989–1992: Peter Hall
1994–1997: Ivor Roberts (chargé d'affaires to 1995)
1997–1999: Brian Donnelly
1999–2000: Robert Gordon (head of the interest section)
2000–2001: David Landsman (chargé d'affaires)
2001–2003: Charles Crawford

Ambassador to Serbia and Montenegro
2003: Sarah Price (chargé d'affaires)
2003–2006: David John Gowan

Ambassador to Serbia
Serbia again from 5 June 2006
2006–2007: David McIlroy (chargé d'affaires)
2007–2010: Stephen Wordsworth
2010-2011: Bill Longhurst (chargé d'affaires)
2011–2013: Michael Davenport
2013–2014: David McFarlane (chargé d'affaires)
2014-2019: Denis Keefe
2019: Tracy Gallagher (chargé d'affaires)

2019-: Sian MacLeod

References

External links
UK and Serbia, gov.uk

Serbia
 
United Kingdom